Below is a list of newspapers published in Vatican City.

L'Osservatore Romano
Donne, Chiesa, Mondo
Vatican News (online only)

See also
List of newspapers
Index of Vatican City-related articles

Vatican City

Newspapers
Newspapers